Víctor Mesa Martínez (born February 20, 1960) is a Cuban baseball manager and former player.

Mesa played for 19 seasons in the Cuban National Series. He is a one-time Olympic gold medalist for baseball, won at the 1992 Summer Olympics. His sons, Víctor Víctor Mesa and Víctor Mesa Jr., defected from Cuba in 2018. Both became professional baseball players in the Miami Marlins organization.

References

External links
 
 

1960 births
Living people
Olympic baseball players of Cuba
Olympic gold medalists for Cuba
Olympic medalists in baseball
Medalists at the 1992 Summer Olympics
Baseball players at the 1992 Summer Olympics
Pan American Games gold medalists for Cuba
Baseball players at the 1983 Pan American Games
Baseball players at the 1987 Pan American Games
Baseball players at the 1991 Pan American Games
Baseball players at the 1995 Pan American Games
Pan American Games medalists in baseball
Central American and Caribbean Games gold medalists for Cuba
Central American and Caribbean Games silver medalists for Cuba
Competitors at the 1982 Central American and Caribbean Games
Competitors at the 1986 Central American and Caribbean Games
Competitors at the 1990 Central American and Caribbean Games
Competitors at the 1993 Central American and Caribbean Games
Goodwill Games medalists in baseball
Central American and Caribbean Games medalists in baseball
Competitors at the 1990 Goodwill Games
Medalists at the 1991 Pan American Games
Medalists at the 1995 Pan American Games